Gerard McLarnon (16 April 1915  – 16 August 1997) was an English-Irish actor and playwright. Born in Clitheroe, Lancashire, England, he was raised in Northern Ireland. His plays have been performed throughout the world, including Ireland, the United Kingdom, Denmark and Australia. He collaborated with, amongst others, Sir John Tavener, Sir Tyrone Guthrie, and Lord Olivier. He had a long-standing creative relationship with theatre director Braham Murray, who directed all his work from 1967 to 1993 at the Century Theatre, the 69 Theatre Company and then the Royal Exchange in Manchester.

McLarnon was survived by his wife, actress Eileen Essell, whom he wed in 1958; they had one child, a son, Fergus.

Play list
Unhallowed 
The Wrestler's Honeymoon (1953)
The Bonefire (1958)
The Rise and Fall of Sammy Posnett (1964)
The Saviour (1967) directed by Braham Murray
The Trial of Joan of Arc (1969) directed by Braham Murray
Blood, Black And Gold  (1980) directed by Braham Murray with Clare Higgins in the lead role at the Royal Exchange Theatre, Manchester 
Quartet From The Idiot (1991)adapted from the novel by Fyodor Dostoyevsky, directed by Braham Murray at the Royal Exchange Theatre, Manchester 
The Brothers Karamazov (1993)adapted from the novel by Fyodor Dostoyevsky, directed by Braham Murray at the Royal Exchange Theatre, Manchester
Victory Morning (mid 1990s) at the Bridewell Theatre, London

References

1915 births
1997 deaths
20th-century British dramatists and playwrights
20th-century Irish male actors
Male dramatists and playwrights from Northern Ireland
Male stage actors from Northern Ireland
Male writers from Northern Ireland
20th-century writers from Northern Ireland
20th-century British male writers